Pierre St-Jean (alternate listings: Pierre St-Jean, Pierre Saint-Jean, Pierre St.Jean; born March 28, 1943 in Montreal, Quebec) is a Canadian weightlifter who competed from the mid-1960s to the mid-1970s. He competed for Canada at the 1964, 1968 and 1976 Summer Olympics, with a best finish of 10th in 1968.

St-Jean also competed in the British Empire and Commonwealth Games, winning a silver medal in 1962, a gold medal in 1966 and a bronze medal in 1970. He won bronze medals at the Pan American Games in 1963 and 1967.

At the 1976 Summer Olympics in Montreal, he took the Athlete's Oath.

He now resides in Orleans, Ontario.

References

Canadian Olympic Committee profile
IOC 1976 Summer Olympics

1943 births
Canadian male weightlifters
Living people
Olympic weightlifters of Canada
Commonwealth Games gold medallists for Canada
Commonwealth Games silver medallists for Canada
Commonwealth Games bronze medallists for Canada
Pan American Games bronze medalists for Canada
Sportspeople from Montreal
Weightlifters at the 1962 British Empire and Commonwealth Games
Weightlifters at the 1966 British Empire and Commonwealth Games
Weightlifters at the 1970 British Commonwealth Games
Weightlifters at the 1964 Summer Olympics
Weightlifters at the 1968 Summer Olympics
Weightlifters at the 1976 Summer Olympics
Commonwealth Games medallists in weightlifting
Pan American Games medalists in weightlifting
Oath takers at the Olympic Games
Weightlifters at the 1963 Pan American Games
Weightlifters at the 1967 Pan American Games
Medalists at the 1963 Pan American Games
Medalists at the 1967 Pan American Games
Medallists at the 1962 British Empire and Commonwealth Games